The Wine Museum (Musée du Vin), located in Ehnen on the Luxembourg side of the Moselle, illustrates the art of wine-making with exhibits of traditional vintner's tools and bottling equipment together with old documents and photographs. The property was acquired by the state in 1974 and opened as a museum in 1978. It occupies the home of a former vintner with winemaking antiques and furnishings.

The museum
Standing close to the banks of the river, the 18th-century house belonged to the prosperous Wellenstein family. The premises also house a cooperage showing how barrels were made, a large wine press, a smithy and the former Ehnen office of weights and measures. The museum exhibits demonstrate the process of wine-making from growing the grapes to bottling the wine. Many of the items in the museum have been donated by local vintners. There is also a small vinyard with all the local grape varieties. As these grapes are grown on government land, the wine made from them is served at official functions such as embassy dinners.

The museum is open from April through October, and is one of the main sites of the annual Riesling Open wine festival.

See also
 List of museums in Luxembourg

References

Museums in Luxembourg
Tourist attractions in Luxembourg
Luxembourg wine
Convention centres in Luxembourg
Wine museums
Museums established in 1978